Cultuur 7 (formerly EXQI Culture) was a Belgian Dutch language speciality television channel broadcast in Flanders and Brussels. The channel broadcast filmed classical music performances, operas, and other cultural programmes in four-hour blocks, especially featuring Flemish productions.

In October 2013, it was renamed as Cultuur 7.

In October 2015, Stingray Digital in Canada acquired Cultuur 7. On 1 December 2015, Cultuur 7 was closed down, and was replaced by the Dutch version of Brava (Stingray acquired the broadcaster in the Netherlands earlier in July 2015); Cultuur 7's programmes were integrated into the new Brava's schedule.

References

External links
 

Television networks in Belgium